Prince Henry of Prussia can refer to:

Prince Henry of Prussia (1726–1802)
Prince Henry of Prussia (1747–1767)
Prince Henry of Prussia (1781–1846)
Prince Henry of Prussia (1862–1929)
Prince Henry of Prussia (1900–1904)